Marcsa Simon (born Mária Cecília Simon 21 November 1882 – 8 January 1954) was a Hungarian actress.

She was born in Tápiószele and died in Budapest.

Selected filmography
 Miska the Magnate (1916)
 St. Peter's Umbrella (1917)
 Oliver Twist (1919)
 Melody of the Heart (1929)
 Hyppolit, the Butler (1931)
 80 Mile Speed (1937)
 The Lady Is a Bit Cracked (1938)
 Borcsa Amerikában (1938)
 Bors István (1939)
 Sarajevo (1940)
 Landslide (1940)
 Dr. Kovács István (1942)
 Song of the Cornfields (1947)

Bibliography
 Kulik, Karol. Alexander Korda: The Man Who Could Work Miracles. Virgin Books, 1990.

External links

1882 births
1954 deaths
Hungarian film actresses
Hungarian silent film actresses
20th-century Hungarian actresses
Hungarian stage actresses
People from Tápiószele